Yuen Kin Man (born 19 January 1989 in Hong Kong) is a former Hong Kong professional footballer and current amateur player for Hong Kong First Division club Happy Valley. He plays as a central midfielder.

Honours
Pegasus
Hong Kong Senior Shield: 2008–09

Career statistics

Club
As of 11 September 2009

International

Hong Kong

Hong Kong U-23
As of 23 February 2011

References

External links
 Yuen Kin Man at HKFA
 Player Information on tswpegasus.com

1989 births
Living people
Hong Kong footballers
Association football midfielders
Hong Kong First Division League players
Shek Kip Mei SA players
TSW Pegasus FC players
Happy Valley AA players
Hong Kong Rangers FC players
Hong Kong international footballers
Footballers at the 2010 Asian Games
Asian Games competitors for Hong Kong